The Superior Court of California, County of Fresno, also known as the Fresno County Superior Court, is the branch of the California superior court with jurisdiction over Fresno County.

History
Fresno County was formed in 1856 from neighboring Mariposa, Merced, and Tulare counties. The mining village of Millertown  was named as the first county seat. The Central Pacific Railroad located its stop at what would become Fresno in May 1872, and the county seat was moved there by popular vote in February 1874.

The 1867 courthouse was described in 1919 as "most substantially constructed ... a mute object lesson to present-day contractors of shoddy and ginger breaded public work". With the removal of the county seat, the entire town of Millerton was abandoned, including the seven-year-old courthouse, which was "left standing by itself, a refuge for owls and bats, and the drunken orgies of the 'noble redman. When the Friant Dam was completed on the San Joaquin River, forming Millerton Lake and inundating the ghost town, the 1867 courthouse was disassembled and moved to a bluff overlooking the lake.

After the county seat was moved to Fresno, the cornerstone for a new courthouse there was laid on October 8, 1874, and the building was accepted on August 19, 1875. The 1875 courthouse was designed by state architect Albert A. Bennett. It was subsequently enlarged in 1893, adding a large copper dome and two new wings. In 1895, after a fire that destroyed the copper dome and gutted the central building, the courthouse was rebuilt. However, a structural survey in 1961 concluded the 1875 courthouse had significant structural defects, and it was torn down in 1966 after a new courthouse was built.

The 1966 courthouse was designed by Wagner & Associates. It is eight stories tall and features decorative grill work over the fascia. Fresno County consolidated municipal and county courts into the Superior Court of Fresno County on July 1, 1998.

The B. F. Sisk Courthouse was originally completed in 1967 as the federal courthouse for the United States District Court for the Eastern District of California, and was vacated in 2006 when the Robert E. Coyle United States Courthouse was completed. The building title was conveyed to the State of California for the nominal sum of US$1 in 2007. It was rededicated on October 4, 2010, for the Fresno Superior Court, which uses the site for civil and family proceedings.

The "M" Street Civil Courthouse is housed in a former banquet hall; operations at "M" Street began in March 2008. The Juvenile Delinquency Court was opened in July 2009.

Venues

All court locations are in the county seat of Fresno. Criminal cases are held at the downtown courthouse location, while the B. F. Sisk location handles civil and family law cases, and the M Street courthouse handles traffic cases. There is a separate juvenile court location, located southeast of the main downtown county court campus.

References

External links
 
 

Superior Court
Superior courts in California